Solen marginatus, common name "grooved razor shell" (Italian: cannolicchio), is a species of marine bivalves in the family Solenidae.

References

Solenidae
Molluscs described in 1777